The Individual championship test grade II equestrian event at the 2004 Summer Paralympics was competed on 22 September. It was won by Irene Slaettengren, representing . Two bronze medals were awarded for tied scores.

Final round
22 Sept. 2004, 10:00

References

2004 Summer Paralympics events